Yengema is a town in  Kono District in the Eastern Province of Sierra Leone, lying approximately  west of Koidu Town (the largest city in Kono District), and about  east of Freetown. The major industries in and around Yengema are diamond mining and agriculture. The town is home to Yengema Airport, the main airfield serving Kono District. A 2012 estimate of Yengema population was 13,358 people.

The population of Yengema is ethnically diverse, though the majority of its residents are ethnic Mandingo and ethnic Kono. The primary language of communication in Yengema is the Krio language, which is widely spoken in the town.  

Yengema is a predominantly Muslim town, though with a significant Christian minority population In the town.

Yengema is home to the Yengema Secondary School (commonly known as YSS), and is among the most prominent secondary schools in Sierra Leone.

Before the civil war, Yengema was one of the most populous cities in Eastern Sierra Leone. During the Sierra Leone civil war, Yengema was heavily damaged and constantly fought over due to the rich diamond reserves in the area. This forced many of the residents to flee the city.

Religion
The majority of the population of Yengema are Muslims at about 70%; Christianity accounts for a large minority of the town population at about 29%. Muslim and Christian people in the town live peacefully together. Religious violence in the city is extremely rare.

Sport
Like the rest of Sierra Leone, football is the most popular sport in the town of Yengema. The town does not have a major football club; however, the Diamond Stars of Kono represent Yengema and the rest of the Kono District in the Sierra Leone National Premier League, the top football league in the country.

Notable people from Yengema
Sia Koroma, First lady of Sierra Leone

References

Populated places in Sierra Leone
Eastern Province, Sierra Leone